Lochiel is a small forestry town in Gert Sibande District Municipality in the Mpumalanga province of South Africa. It lies near the border with Eswatini.

References

Populated places in the Albert Luthuli Local Municipality